John Goodman (born 1952) is an American actor.

John Goodman may also refer to:

People
John Goodman (MP) (c. 1540–1604), MP for Lichfield
John Goodman (Dean of Wells) (c. 1500–1561)
John Goodman (pilgrim) (c. 1595–1623/27), early Pilgrim to the Americas in the 1620s
John Goodman (Jesuit) (died 1642), Welsh priest
John Goodman (Australian politician) (1828–1874), pastoralist and politician in colonial Victoria
John Goodman (Velocette) (1857–1929), motorcycle pioneer
John Goodman (athlete) (born 1937), Australian Olympic sprinter
John Goodman (American football) (born 1945), American football player
John B. Goodman (art director) (1901–1991), American art director
John B. Goodman (industrialist) (born 1963), American multi-millionaire and polo player
Johnny Goodman (1909–1970), golfer
Johnny Goodman (TV producer) (1927–2015), British television producer
John C. Goodman, economist
John F. Goodman (born 1945), U.S. Marine Corps general
John Reinhard Goodman (died 1865), Episcopal clergyman who served as Chaplain of the Senate

Other
John Goodman (EP), a comedy EP by Nina West

See also
John Goodmanson (born 1968), U.S. recording engineer
Jon Goodman (born 1971), former footballer
Jack Goodman (born 1973), Republican member of the Missouri Senate